National Highway 548H, commonly referred to as NH 548H is a national highway in India. It is a spur road of National Highway 48.  NH-548H traverses the states of Karnataka and Maharashtra in India.

Route 
Karnataka
Sankeshwar

Maharashtra
Gadhinglaj, Ajara, Amboli, Madkhol, Sawantwadi, Insuli - Maharashtra border.

Goa border - Banda.

Junctions  
 
  Terminal near Sankeshwar.
  Terminal near Banda.

See also 
 List of National Highways in India
 List of National Highways in India by state

References

External links 

 NH 548H on OpenStreetMap

National highways in India
National Highways in Karnataka
National Highways in Maharashtra